Deutsche Schule Sankt Petersburg (DSP) is a German international school in St. Petersburg, Russia. As of 2010 it serves levels Vorschule (preschool) through grade 10, with plans to expand to grade 12 and the Abitur. The German government and the Central Agency for German Schools Abroad support the school, which was founded in September 2009.

See also
 List of higher education and academic institutions in Saint Petersburg
 History of Germans in Russia, Ukraine and the Soviet Union

References

External links
 Deutsche Schule Sankt Petersburg 

German international schools in Russia
International schools in Saint Petersburg
Educational institutions established in 2009
2009 establishments in Russia